Corner Stop (Spanish:Esquina, bajan...!) is a 1948 Mexican romantic comedy film directed by Alejandro Galindo and starring David Silva, Fernando Soto and Olga Jiménez. The film's sets were designed by the art director Gunther Gerszo. It is set in urban Mexico, which grew rapidly during the era. The title refers to a bus route.

Partial cast
 David Silva as Gregorio del Prado 
 Fernando Soto as Constantino Reyes Almanza 'Regalito'  
 Olga Jiménez as Cholita  
 Delia Magaña as La Bicha, mesera  
 Salvador Quiroz as Don Octaviano Lara y Puente  
 Miguel Manzano as Axcaná González  
 Francisco Pando as Fidel Yáñez  
 Eugenia Galindo as Doña Chabela  
 Jorge Arriaga as Robles, esbirro de Langarica  
 Ángel Infante as Menchaca 'Rayito de Sol'  
 Mario Castillo
 Pin Crespo as Isabel  
 Pedro León as Don Roque  
 Carmen Novelty as Pasajera rubia falsa  
 Joaquín Roche as Policía  
 Ernesto Finance as Despachador  
 Jorge Martínez de Hoyos as Rabanito  
 Víctor Parra as Manuel Largo Langarica

References

Bibliography 
 Segre, Erica. Intersected Identities: Strategies of Visualisation in Nineteenth- and Twentieth-century Mexican Culture. Berghahn Books, 2007.

External links 
 

1948 films
1948 romantic comedy films
1940s Spanish-language films
Films directed by Alejandro Galindo
Mexican black-and-white films
Mexican romantic comedy films
1940s Mexican films